A mixed electoral system or mixed-member electoral system combines methods of majoritarian and proportional representation (PR). The majoritarian component is usually first-past-the-post voting (FPTP/SMP), whereas the proportional component is most often based on party-list PR. The results of the combination may be mixed-member proportional (MMP), where the overall results of the elections are proportional, or mixed-member majoritarian, in which case the overall results are semi-proportional, retaining disproportionalities from the majoritarian component.

Mixed-member systems also often combine local representation (most often single-member constituencies) with regional or national (multi-member constituencies) representation, having multiple tiers. This also means voters often elect different types of representatives who might have different types constituencies. Some representatives may be elected by personal elections where voters vote for candidates, and some by list elections where voter vote primarily for electoral lists of parties).

In most mixed systems, every voter can influence both the district-based and PR aspects of an election, such as under parallel voting; in others, the voter casts just one vote (mixed single vote), which is used to contribute to both a personal (usually district) election and to the filling of seats through list system .  Most mixed systems have all the voters contributing to the election of both groups of members.

Types of mixed systems

Compensatory/non-compensatory seat allocation 
A major distinction is often made between mixed compensatory systems and mixed non-compensatory systems. In both types of systems, one set of seats is allocated using a plurality or majoritarian method, usually First past the post. The remaining seats are allocated to political parties partially or wholly based on a proportional allocation method such as highest averages or largest remainder. The difference is whether or not the results of the district elections are considered when allocating the PR seats.

In mixed non-compensatory systems, such as parallel voting, the proportional allocation is performed independently of the district election component.

In mixed compensatory systems, the allocation of the top-up seats is done in such a way as to compensate as much as possible for dis-proportionality produced by the district elections. MMP generally produces proportional election outcomes, meaning that a political party that wins n percent of the vote will receive roughly n percent of the seats.

The following hypothetical example based on the one by Massicotte illustrates how "top-up" PR seats are typically allocated in a compensatory system and in a non-compensatory system. The example assumes a 200-seat legislative assembly where 100 seats are filled using FPTP and the other 100 seats are awarded to parties using a form of PR. The table below gives the popular vote and FPTP results. The number of PR seats allocated to each party depends on whether the system is compensatory or non-compensatory.

In non compensatory system, each party wins its proportional share of the 100 PR seats. Under such a system, the total number of seats (FPTP + PR) received by each party would not be proportional to its share of the popular vote. Party A receives just slightly less of the popular vote than Party B, but receives significantly more seats. In addition to its success in the district contests, Party A receives almost as many of the PR seats as Party B.

If the PR seats are allocated in a compensatory system, the total number of seats awarded to each party is proportional to the party's share of the popular vote. Party B wins 33 of the district seats and its proportional share of the 200 seats being filled is 80 seats (40 percent of the total 200 seats) (the same as its share of the popular vote) so it is awarded 47 of the PR seats.

In practice, compensatory seat allocation is complicated by the possibility that one or more parties wins so many of the district seats ("overhang") that the available number of PR seats is insufficient to produce a fully proportional outcome. Some mixed compensatory systems have rules that address these situations by adding additional PR seats to achieve overall PR. These seats are used only until the next election, unless needed again at that time.

The two common ways compensation occurs are seat linkage compensation (or top-up) and vote linkage compensation (or vote transfer). Like a non-compensatory mixed system, a compensatory mixed system may be based on the mixed single vote (voters vote for a local candidate and that vote is used to set the party share of the popular vote for the party that the candidate belongs to) or it may be based on voters casting two separate votes.

Types of combinations 
Apart from the compensatory/non-compensatory typology, a more detailed classification is possible based on how component systems relate to each other, according to academic literature. Below is a table of different categories of mixed electoral systems based on the five main types identified by Massicotte & Blais. According to their terminology, methods of compensation are referred to as compensation is referred to as correction, while another type of dependent combination exists, called the conditional relation between sub-systems. Meanwhile, independent combinations mixed systems might have both local and national/regional tiers (called superposition), but some have only one at-large (national) tier, like the majority bonus system (fusion) or only a single tier for local/regional representation (called coexistence).

There are also supermixed systems, like rural-urban proportional (RUP), which is a hybrid mixed system that uses STV in urban regions and MMP (itself a mixed system) in rural-regions. Another supermixed system is scorporo, which is a hybrid of parallel voting and the mixed single vote).

In a hybrid system, different electoral formulas are used in different contexts. These may be seen in coexistence, when different methods are used in different regions of a country, such as when FPTP is used in single-member districts and list-PR in multi-member districts, but every voter is a member of only one district (one tier). Some hybrid systems are generally not referred to as mixed systems, such as when as FPTP districts are the exception (e.g. overseas constituency) and list-PR is the rule, the overall system is usually considered proportional. Similarly, when FPTP is in single-member districts and used block voting (or party block voting) is used in multi-member districts, the system is referred to as a majoritarian one, as all components are majoritarian. Most mixed systems are not referred to as hybrid systems

Mixed-member majoritarian and mixed-member proportional 

Another distinction of mixed electoral systems is between mixed-member proportional representation (MMP) and mixed-member majoritarian representation (MMM).

Parallel voting 

Parallel voting is a mixed non-compensatory system with two tiers of representatives: a tier of single-member district representatives elected by a plurality/majoritarian method such as FPTP/SMP, and a tier of regional or at-large representatives elected by a separate proportional method such as party list PR. It is used for the first chamber (lower house) in many countries including Japan and Russia.

This type of parallel voting provides semi-proportional results, but is often referred to as mixed-member majoritarian representation, as the lack of compensation means each party can keep all the overhang seats it might win on the majoritarian side of the electoral system.

Additional member systems (AMS) 

Like parallel voting, MMP and AMS also have a tier of district representatives typically elected by FPTP, and a tier of regional or at-large representatives elected by PR. Unlike parallel voting, MMP and AMS are mixed compensatory systems, meaning that the PR seats are allocated in a manner that corrects disproportionality caused by the district tier. MMP corrects disproportionalities by adding as many leveling seats as needed, this system is used by Germany and New Zealand.

The type of MMP which does not always yield proportional results, but sometimes only "mixed semi-proportional representation" is called an additional member system. If the fixed number of compensatory seats are enough to compensate the results of the majoritarian FPTP/SMP side of the election, AMS is equivalent to MMP, but if not, AMS does not compensate for remaining overhang seats. In Bolivia and Lesotho, where single vote versions of AMS are used with a relatively large number of compensatory seats, results are usually proportional. AMS models used in parts of the UK (Scotland and Wales), with small regions with a fixed number of seats tend to produce only moderately proportional election outcomes.

Majority bonus and majority jackpot systems 

Electoral systems with a majority bonus have been referred to as "unconventional mixed systems". Employed by Armenia, Greece, and San Marino, as well as Italy from 2006 to 2013, majority bonuses help the most popular party or alliance win a majority of the seats with a minority of the votes, similar in principle to plurality/majoritarian systems. However, PR is used to distribute seats among the opposition parties, and possibly within the governing alliance.

Scorporo and negative vote transfer (NVT) 

Scorporo is a two-tier mixed system similar to MMP in that voters have two votes (one for a local candidate on the lower tier, and one for a party list on the upper tier), except that disproportionality caused by the single-member district tier is partially addressed through a vote transfer mechanism. Votes that are crucial to the election of district-winning candidates are excluded from the PR seat allocation, for this reason the method used by scorporo is referred to as a negative vote transfer system. The system was used in Italy from 1993 to 2005, and a modified version is currently used in Hungary.

Mixed ballot transferable vote (MBTV) 

MBTV is a mixed compensatory type of systems similar to MSV, except voters can vote separately for a local candidate and as a transfer vote on the compensatory tier. It is different from MMP/AMS and AV+ in that there is a vote linkage (instead of seat linkage) between the tiers. The two parts of the dual ballot are tied in a way that only those lists votes get counted, which are on ballots that would be transfer votes in an equivalent positive vote transfer MSV system.

Alternative vote plus (AV+) 

AV+ is a mixed compensatory system similar to the additional member system, with the notable difference that the district seats are awarded using the alternative vote. The system was proposed by the Jenkins Commission as a possible alternative to FPTP for elections to the Parliament of the United Kingdom.

Dual member proportional (DMP) 

DMP is a mixed compensatory system similar to MMP, except that the plurality and PR seats are paired and dedicated to dual-member (two seat) districts. Proposed as an alternative to FPTP for Canadian elections, DMP appeared as an option on a 2016 plebiscite in Prince Edward Island and a 2018 referendum in British Columbia.

Number of votes

Double vote 
Most mixed systems allow voters to cast separate votes for different formulas of the electoral system, including:

 Parallel voting
 Most AMS/MMP systems
 AV+ (the first vote is ranked)
 Scorporo

Mixed single vote (MSV) 

MSV is a type of mixed systems using only a single vote that serves both as a vote for a local candidate and as a party list vote, split ticket voting is not possible. The system was used in Germany in a mixed proportional system, and is currently used in Hungary as a semi-proportional system as well as Italy in a non-compensatory system. Other mixed systems using a single vote include majority bonus/jackpot systems and DMP.

Other systems that are usually considered mixed, which use a single vote are:

 Majority bonus and jackpot (a single party-list vote)
 DMP (a vote for a single candidate or a two-candidate ticket)
 RUP (a single transferable vote, only in urban districts)

Double simultaneous vote (DSV) 

A simultaneous vote is a single vote that used in more than one elections held at once, which means it is not a typically regarded as a mixed system.

List of countries using mixed systems

The table below lists the countries that use a mixed electoral system for the first chamber of the legislature. Countries with coexistence-based hybrid systems have been excluded from the table, as have countries that mix two plurality/majoritarian systems. (See also the complete list of electoral systems by country.)

See also
 Electoral systems
 List of electoral systems by country
 Proportional representation
 Semi-proportional representation
 Representative democracy
 Types of democracy

References

External links
 Chamber 1 Electoral Systems Map from the ACE Electoral Knowledge Network

Electoral systems